Had Oued Ifrane is a town in Ifrane Province, Fès-Meknès, Morocco. According to the 2004 census it had a population of 2,488.

References

Populated places in Ifrane Province